Le Tour De La Question is a Live album by the French progressive rock band Ange. It was released in 2007.

Track listing
"Aujourd'hui C'est La Fête Chez L'apprenti Sorcier"  – 05:00
"Le Couteau Suisse"  – 03:58
"Histoires D'Outre Rêve"  – 10:37
"Vu D'un Chien"  – 06:40
"Si J'étais Le Messie"  – 04:31
"Jour Après Jour"  – 06:41
"Entre Foutre Et Foot"  – 03:00
"Harmonie"  – 07:20
"Le Cœur À Corps"  – 05:03
"Le Chien, La Poubelle Et La Rose"  – 08:53
"Ces Gens-Là"  – 06:07
DVD:
"Le Tour De La Question [Poème]"  – 01:48
"Le Couteau Suisse"  – 03:55
"Aujourd'hui C'est La Fête Chez L'apprenti Sorcier"  – 04:40
"Ricochets"  – 07:13
"Histoires D'Outre Rêve"  – 10:34
"Vu D'un Chien"  – 06:23
"Si J'étais Le Messie"  – 04:42
"Jour Après Jour"  – 06:22
"Entre Foutre Et Foot"  – 03:52
"Harmonie"  – 07:06
"Le Cœur À Corps"  – 05:02
"Le Ballon De Billy"  – 08:25
"Gag [Parodie De "L'été Indien"]" – 01:36
"Jazzouillis"  – 03:58
"Fils De Lumière"  – 07:02
"Le Chien, La Poubelle Et La Rose"  – 07:37
"Ces Gens-Là"  – 06:11
"Quasimodo"  – 13:45
"Capitaine Cœur De Miel"  – 18:43

Personnel
Lead Vocals, Acoustic Guitar, Keyboards, Accordion: Christian Decamps
Vocals: Caroline Crozat
Keyboards, Backing Vocals: Tristan Decamps
Guitar, Backing Vocals: Hassan Hajdi
Bass, Backing Vocals: Thierry Sidhoum
Drums, Percussion: Benoît Cazzulini

References
Le Tour De La Question on ange-updlm 
Le Tour De La Question on www.amarokprog.net

Ange albums
2007 live albums